Clear Lake Park may refer to:
Clear Lake State Park (disambiguation), parks in several US states
Clearlake Park, California